Richland is a city in Rankin County, Mississippi, United States. The population was 6,912 at the 2010 census. It is a suburb of Jackson, and is part of the Jackson Metropolitan Statistical Area.

Geography
Richland is located at  (32.229844, -90.159724).

Demographics

2020 census

As of the 2020 United States census, there were 7,137 people, 2,645 households, and 1,888 families residing in the city.

2000 census
As of the census of 2000, there were 6,027 people, 2,303 households, and 1,688 families residing in the city. The population density was 492.7 people per square mile (190.3/km2). There were 2,540 housing units at an average density of 207.6 per square mile (80.2/km2). The racial makeup of the city was 60% White, 40% African American, 0.08% Native American, 1.51% Asian, 0.02% Pacific Islander, 0.20% from other races, and 0.95% from two or more races. Hispanic or Latino of any race were 0.88% of the population.

There were 2,303 households, out of which 37.5% had children under the age of 18 living with them, 54.8% were married couples living together, 13.4% had a female householder with no husband present, and 26.7% were non-families. 21.8% of all households were made up of individuals, and 6.8% had someone living alone who was 65 years of age or older. The average household size was 2.62 and the average family size was 3.05.

In the city, the population was spread out, with 27.3% under the age of 18, 9.8% from 18 to 24, 33.6% from 25 to 44, 20.1% from 45 to 64, and 9.3% who were 65 years of age or older. The median age was 32 years. For every 100 females, there were 98.2 males. For every 100 females age 18 and over, there were 94.0 males.

The median income for a household in the city was $38,996, and the median income for a family was $44,800. Males had a median income of $32,377 versus $22,700 for females. The per capita income for the city was $17,574. About 8.3% of families and 10.4% of the population were below the poverty line, including 11.2% of those under age 18 and 19.8% of those age 65 or over.

Government
The Mayor of Richland is former alderman Pat Sullivan, who is serving his first term.

Education
The three public schools in Richland are operated by the Rankin County School District.

See also

 List of municipalities in Mississippi
 National Register of Historic Places listings in Rankin County, Mississippi

References

External links

 Government

 General information
 
 Rankin County School District at Blackboard, Inc.
 Richland Public Library at Central Mississippi Regional Library System (cmrls.lib.ms.us)

1974 establishments in Mississippi
Cities in Jackson metropolitan area, Mississippi
Cities in Mississippi
Cities in Rankin County, Mississippi
Populated places established in 1974